Paul Epstein was a German mathematician.

Paul Epstein may also refer to:

Paul Sophus Epstein, Russian-American mathematical physicist
Paul A. Epstein, member of Relâche (musical group)

See also
Paul Eppstein German sociologist